The following is a list of Indonesian feature films showing in theaters and those being channeled on video-on-demand services in 2022.

Box office collection

January–March

April–June

April
 Tuhan Minta Duit
 I Need You Baby
 Tutuge 
 Oma the Demonic 
 KKN di Desa Penari 
 Kuntilanak 3

May
 Cinta Subuh

June
 Ngeri-Ngeri Sedap
Rumah Kuntilanak 
Satria Dewa: Gatotkaca 
Madu Murni

July–September

July
 Ivanna
Ghost Writer 2
The Sacred Riana 2: Bloody Mary

August
 Before, Now & Then
Satan's Slaves 2: Communion 
 Sayap-Sayap Patah 
 Mencuri Raden Saleh

September
 Mumun 
 Mendarat Darurat
 Noktah Merah Perkawinan 
 Lara Ati 
Jailangkung: Sandekala 
Until Tomorrow 
 Jagat Arwah

October- December

October
 Pamali 
 Inang
 Perfect Strangers  
 Rumah Kaliurang

November
 Perempuan Bergaun Merah 
 Nariti, Romansa Danau Toba 
 Sri Asih 
 Ashiap Man

December
Qorin  
Like & Share 
Nagih Janji Cinta 
Cek Toko Sebelah 2
 Tumbal Kanjeng Iblis 
KKN di Desa Penari: Luwih Dowo, Luwih Medeni

References 

Indonesia